Skena River (Swedish: Skenaån) is a river in  the province of Östergötland in eastern Sweden. Its well is on the plains of the town of Skänninge and it ends in the river "Svartån" (Black river).

See also
Skeena River

References

Östergötland
Rivers of Östergötland County